Melville Francis "Pen" Pengelly (17 March 1901 – 24 September 1973) was a New Zealand cricket umpire. He stood in four Test matches between 1946 and 1952.

Pengelly attended Christ's College, Christchurch, and played senior club cricket in Christchurch for St Albans. He took up umpiring in the 1930s and umpired 19 first-class matches between 1937 and 1955, most of them in Wellington. He umpired the first two Test matches in New Zealand after the Second World War: in Wellington in March 1946 and in Christchurch in March 1947, as well as two other Tests in 1951 and 1952.

See also
 List of Test cricket umpires

References

1901 births
1973 deaths
Sportspeople from Christchurch
People educated at Christ's College, Christchurch
New Zealand Test cricket umpires